Jorge Inés (born 15 March 1945) is a former Guatemalan cyclist. He competed in the individual road race and the team time trial events at the 1968 Summer Olympics.

References

External links
 

1945 births
Living people
Guatemalan male cyclists
Olympic cyclists of Guatemala
Cyclists at the 1968 Summer Olympics
People from Quetzaltenango